Finely Honed Machine is a song by Foetus Über Frisco, written by J. G. Thirlwell. It was released as a single in 1984 by Self Immolation.

Formats and track listing 
All songs written by J. G. Thirlwell
UK 12" single (WOMB UNC 7.12)
"Finely Honed Machine"
"Sick Minutes (Unmutual)"

Personnel
Adapted from the Finely Honed Machine liner notes.
 J. G. Thirlwell (as Foetus Über Frisco) – vocals, instruments, production, engineering (B)
 Charles Gray – engineering
 Warne Livesey – engineering (A)

Charts

Release history

References

External links 
 
 Finely Honed Machine at foetus.org

1984 songs
1984 singles
Foetus (band) songs
Songs written by JG Thirlwell